Mahanandin was the last king of the Shishunaga dynasty of the Indian subcontinent. The dynasty ruled parts of ancient India around the city of Pataliputra (present day Patna, Bihar).

Life
Puranas list Nandivardhana as the ninth Shishunaga king and his son Mahanandin as the tenth and the last Shishunaga king. Mahanandin was killed by his illegitimate son from a Shudra wife named Mahapadma Nanda.

References

Citations

Sources
 
 
 

4th-century BC Indian monarchs
History of Bihar
Year of birth missing
Year of death missing
Kings of Magadha